Lennart Axelsson (born 1953) is a Swedish politician who is a member of the Swedish Social Democratic Party in the Riksdag.

Axelssonwas first elected to the Riksdag in 2000 and has represented Örebro County ever since.  Within the Riksdag he is a member of the Social Committee and a deputy member of the Committee on Finance.  He is also the Kvittningsman for his political party.

References

1953 births
Living people